Moggallana III was King of Anuradhapura in the 7th century, whose reign lasted from 608 to 614. He succeeded Sangha Tissa II as King of Anuradhapura and was succeeded by Silameghavanna.

See also
 List of Sri Lankan monarchs
 History of Sri Lanka

References

External links
 Kings & Rulers of Sri Lanka
 Codrington's Short History of Ceylon

Monarchs of Anuradhapura
M
M
M